Third Raid on Banu Thalabah took place in September, 627AD, 6th month of 6AH of the Islamic calendar

In Jumada Ath-Thania, Zaid as the commander of 15 men raided Bani Tha‘labah and captured 20 of their camels but the tribe members had fled. He spent four days there and then returned to Medina.

The First Raid on Banu Thalabah had taken place two months earlier.

Islamic Primary sources
This event is mentioned in Ibn Sa'd, Kitab al-tabaqat al-kabir, Volume 2

See also
Military career of Muhammad
List of expeditions of Muhammad

Notes

627
Campaigns ordered by Muhammad